"PharmaRusical" is the second episode of the tenth season of the American reality competition television series RuPaul's Drag Race, which aired on VH1 on March 29, 2018. Halsey and Padma Lakshmi serve as guest judges, alongside regular panelists RuPaul, Michelle Visage, and Ross Mathews. Andy Cohen and Alyssa Edwards also appear in the episode.

Reception
Bowen Yang and Matt Rogers on Vulture.com rated the episode 5 out of 5 stars. Metro Weekly Rhuaridh Marr called the musical number "dreadful".

See also 

 List of Rusicals

References

External links
 PharmaRusical at IMDb

2018 American television episodes
American LGBT-related television episodes
RuPaul's Drag Race episodes